IBM FlashSystem is an IBM Storage enterprise system that stores data on flash memory. Unlike storage systems that use standard solid-state drives, IBM FlashSystem products incorporate custom hardware based on technology from the 2012 IBM acquisition of Texas Memory Systems.

According to Gartner, IBM was the number one all-flash storage array vendor in 2014 selling over 2,100 FlashSystems totaling 62 petabytes (PB) of capacity.  The IBM FlashSystem commanded 33% of the total all-flash capacity sold by all vendors for the year.

As of February 12, 2020 the FlashSystem brand has replaced both the Storwize and XIV brands in IBM.

History

Origin 

The IBM FlashSystem architecture was originally developed by Texas Memory Systems (TMS) as their RamSan product line. TMS was a small private company founded in 1978 and based in Houston, Texas that supplied solid-state drive products to the market longer than any other company. The TMS RamSan line of enterprise solid state storage products was first launched in the early 2000s with the RamSan-520, and over seven RamSan technology generations were released through 2012, when TMS was acquired by IBM. As RamSan technology evolved, TMS adapted the systems to different storage media (DRAM, single-level cell flash memory, and multi-level cell flash memory) and external storage area network interfaces (Fibre Channel and InfiniBand), but the core system design principles remained relatively constant: custom hardware with a shared internal network to maximize speed, particularly latency. The last RamSan products available were the RamSan-710, RamSan-810, RamSan-720, and RamSan-820 systems, which were replaced directly with corresponding IBM FlashSystem products in 2013.

Integration into IBM 

IBM FlashSystem products were first made generally available on April 11, 2013, in conjunction with the announcement of a US$1 billion investment in flash optimization research and development. At the Flash Ahead event, IBM emphasized the economic "tipping point" that flash had reached versus traditional storage devices for high-performance applications.

On January 16, 2014, IBM announced the FlashSystem 840 product, which was the first FlashSystem designed entirely by IBM post-acquisition of TMS. The key enhancements of the new generation were RAS enhancements, higher capacities, higher performance, new 16 Gbit Fibre Channel and 10 Gbit Fibre Channel over Ethernet interfaces, and a new management GUI. IBM also announced the FlashSystem Enterprise Performance Solution, which added software features and functions to the 840, including real-time compression, replication, and snapshots.

IBM refreshed the product line on February 19, 2015 by announcing the FlashSystem 900 model AE2, a direct replacement for the FlashSystem 840, and the FlashSystem V9000 which combined a FlashSystem 900 model AE2 enclosure with a pair of San Volume Controllers.  The V9000 brought software-defined storage into the FlashSystem brand for the first time, all managed under one management domain, also called a single-pane-of-glass.  Both of these products relied on Micron Technology's MLC flash chip technology

The product line was expanded on April 27, 2016 when IBM announced two new products, the FlashSystem A9000 and A9000R model 415.  Both of these products included features specifically designed for cloud environments.  They incorporated pattern removal, data de-duplication, and real-time compression combined with the IBM FlashCore technology to deliver consistent low latency performance.  The A9000 was a fully configured solution, while the A9000R enabled a grid architecture and the ability to scale to petabytes of storage.  These products relied on Spectrum Accelerate (formerly XIV) running on dedicated grid controllers to perform the software defined storage functions coupled with FlashSystem 900 storage enclosures.  The A9000 included the ability to migrate from XIV Gen3 systems.

FlashSystem brand replaces XIV brand 

IBM announced an update to the FlashSystem 900 on October 23, 2017, with new models AE3 and UF3.  This marks the first time that the FlashSystem brand offered a consumption model UF3 for the product line whereby a customer would only pay for what they used.  The update tripled the capacity of the array and added at-line-speed hardware user data compression.  The MicroLatency flash modules were updated to 32-layer 3D TLC NAND flash from Micron.  Rather than the compression feature slowing down data access as usually happens with software based compression, the 900 continued to advertise 1.2 million I/O operations per second (IOPs) due to the hardware compression implementation and hardware only data path.  The compression engines were implemented in each flash module and, with the capability to have up to 12 modules per enclosure, a fully loaded enclosure therefore would have a total of 12 hardware compression engines. 

The very next day on October 24, 2017 IBM announced an update to the FlashSystem A9000 with the new model 425.  This new model would incorporate the previously-announced FlashSystem 900 model AE3, but retain the same grid controllers as the 415 model.  With two generations of FlashSystem A9000 now in the market, the 415 model and the 425 model, IBM on February 27, 2018 announced the end of marketing for the XIV storage systems models 214 and 314, commonly known as "XIV Gen3".  They listed the replacement product as the A9000 model 425.  This announcement marked the end of the XIV Storage System brand with the FlashSystem brand taking its place.

FlashSystem brand replaces Storwize brand 

With the announcement of the FlashSystem 9100 on July 10, 2018, the product line added a new enclosure that was designed with NVM Express (NVMe) from end-to-end.  The 9100 was the first FlashSystem product which combined the Spectrum Virtualize software stack with the IBM Flash Core Module technology in a single enclosure.  To achieve this, IBM redesigned the proprietary custom form-factor MicroLatency Flash Modules with FlashCore technology into a standard 2 1/2 inch form-factor NVMe SSD.  The included Flash Core Modules were available in 4.8TB, 9.6TB, and 19.2TB capacities with up to 5:1 compression.

On February 12, 2020, IBM announced an expansion of the FlashSystem line to include the FlashSystem 7200, FlashSystem 9200, and FlashSystem 9200R.  Additionally, IBM announced the FlashSystem 5010, 5030, and 5100 which are re-branded Storwize storage enclosures.  With this announcement, IBM retired the Storwize brand and simplified the distributed storage portfolio underneath the FlashSystems brand.  The Storwize V5000 and V5100 are replaced by the FlashSystem 5000 and 5100 respectively.  The FlashSystem 900 and Storwize V7000 are replaced by the FlashSystem 7200.  The FlashSystem V9000 and 9100 are replaced by the FlashSystem 9200.  The FlashSystem A9000R is replaced by the FlashSystem 9200R.  With this announcement, the FlashSystem product line will no longer include enclosures with end-to-end hardware only data path technology from the Texas Memory Systems (RamSan) acquisition nor will it include enclosures running Spectrum Accelerate software from the (XIV) acquisition, however, the product still retains the IBM FlashCore based flash modules developed at TMS

Technology 

IBM FlashSystem products are based on a custom hardware architecture that incorporates field-programmable gate arrays (FPGAs). The FlashSystem design omits traditional server-based array controllers. The primary components of each FlashSystem unit include custom flash modules, external storage area network interfaces, and FPGA logic that spreads data through the system. Each flash module within a FlashSystem incorporates enterprise multi-level cell or single-level cell flash chips and FPGAs that provide IBM Variable Stripe RAID data protection as well as standard flash memory controller functions. IBM claims that these architectural attributes provide strong performance, reliability, and efficiency. In August 2013, IBM submitted a single FlashSystem 820 SPC-1 benchmark result to the Storage Performance Council that showed fast response time (SPC-1 LRT) and high SPC-1 IOPS per external storage port - common measures of high storage performance - as well as low power consumption.

IBM claims that enterprise multi-level cell flash plus Variable Stripe RAID and other IBM reliability technology forms a good balance between reliability and economics for most enterprise environments. IBM Variable Stripe RAID is a patented highly granular RAID 5 type data protection arrangement implemented across each set of 10 flash chips in the system. IBM FlashSystem 900, 840, 820, and 720 products also include a second layer of RAID 5 implemented within the data distribution logic at the system level, providing "two-dimensional" data protection within the system. IBM claims that this two-dimensional protection is strongly differentiated within the industry.

Models

FlashSystem A9000 and A9000R 
IBM FlashSystem A9000 is a 8U rackmount unit with up to 300 TB of usable storage capacity provided by FlashSystem 900 modules, managed by IBM Spectrum Accelerate software. It's scalable sibling, the FlashSystem A9000R, consists of a minimum of two units, scaling to 6 units or 1.8 PB usable in a 42U rack. A9000R units share CPU, cache and access paths with their neighbours, leveraging a zero-tuning data distribution design. The FlashSystem A9000 family supports IBM Real-time Compression, real-time global deduplication and real-time pattern removal, while maintaining average access times of 250 µs under database workloads. Up to 144 instances of FlashSystem A9000 and XIV Storage Systems can be combined into one HyperScale cluster with client multitenancy. Since A9000, A9000R and XIV Storage Systems share the Spectrum Accelerate management software, the FlashSystem A9000R is occasionally referred to as XIV Gen4.

FlashSystem 900 and V9000

FlashSystem V9000 
IBM FlashSystem V9000 is a 6U rackmount with up to 57 TB of usable storage capacity provided by FlashSystem 900 modules, managed by IBM Spectrum Virtualize software. The system supports a wide range of advanced data services such as IBM Real-time Compression and external storage virtualization.  With scalability up to 456 TB of usable capacity (over 2 PB of effective capacity when using Real-time Compression), FlashSystem V9000 is targeted for mixed workload environments.

FlashSystem 900 
IBM FlashSystem 900 is composed of IBM enhanced MLC flash technology. The system is a 2U rackmount unit with up to 57TB of RAID-5, usable storage capacity. The system supports a high-availability architecture with redundant and hot-swappable components, IBM optimized ECC, IBM Variable Stripe RAID, and two-dimensional flash RAID for data protection. With read IOPS of 1,100,000 and write IOPS of 600,000, FlashSystem 900 is targeted for OLTP and OLAP databases.

On October 24, 2017 IBM announced an update to the FlashSystem 900 to add support for hardware-accelerated, inline data compression, but update loosened flash technology to 3D triple-level cell (TLC).

FlashSystem 840 and V840 
Both products were released in jan 2014 and were improved in May 2014 with new entry level capacity points and more protocols. Both models supports ECC, IBM Variable Stripe RAID, and two-dimensional flash RAID for data protection and offers hot-swap flash modules and power supplies. The systems also supports a wide range of software-defined storage services including:  Real-time Compression, external storage virtualization, snapshots, replication, IBM Easy Tier, VAAI, and thin provisioning.

FlashSystem V840 
IBM FlashSystem V840 was a 6U rackmount with up to 40TB of usable storage capacity and targeted for workloads that need high velocity data access and advanced storage services. It is the predecessor of the FlashSystem V9000.

FlashSystem 840 
FlashSystem 840 was composed of enterprise multi-level cell (eMLC) flash technology and was a 2U rackmount unit with up to 48TB of usable storage capacity, 40TB with RAID 5. With read IOPS of 1,100,000 and write IOPS of 600,000, FlashSystem 840 is targeted for OLTP and OLAP databases, scientific applications and cloud services.
 It is the predecessor of the FlashSystem 900.

Early models

See also 

 IBM DS8000 and DS6000 series - Power-based storage series

References

External links 

 Official IBM Flash Storage website
 FlashSystem V9000 product website
 FlashSystem 900 product website
 Flash Ahead Initiative launch press release
 SAN Volume Controller + FlashSystem Redbook

Computer peripherals
IBM storage servers
Data storage
Solid-state computer storage
Solid-state computer storage media